Ali Shabani Bengar (born 18 May 1995) is an Iranian freestyle wrestler who competes at 97 kilograms. Shabani has claimed the 2021 Asian Continental Championship as well as a bronze medal from the 2018 U23 World Championships. He was also the World Championship representative for Iran in 2019 and is a two–time IRI World Team Member.

Career

2018–2019 
After winning the U23 Iranian World Team Trials, Shabani made his international debut at the 2018 U23 World Championships, where he claimed a bronze medal. In 2019, he competed at the World Championships (Reza Yazdani, who had beaten Shabani was forced to pull out of the event, and as Shabani had been the '19 IRI World Team Trials runner–up, he was a replacement), helped his homeland place first at the Clubs World Cup and also claimed silver from the Yasar Dogu.

2020–2021 
After the COVID-19 outbreak slowed down, Shabani competed at the Iranian World Team Trials in November 2020, in an attempt to qualify for the Individual World Cup. After notably defeating Mojtaba Goleij, he went on to violently upset the dominant Mohammad Hossein Mohammadian twice in a row to claim the spot, although he ended up not being sent to the Individual World Cup.

To start off 2021, Shabani claimed the Asian Continental Championship. Days before, Mohammadian qualified the weight for the 2020 Summer Olympics for Iran with a dominant run at the Asian Olympic Qualification Tournament. The Iranian Wrestling Federation decided that the Poland Open (which took place on June 8) would decide the country's representative at the Summer Olympics, contested between Shabani, Alireza Karimi and Mohammad Hossein Mohammadian. After wins over '19 World Championship medalist Magomedgadzhi Nurov and multiple–time Asian Championship medalist Alisher Yergali, he was defeated by Mohammad Hossein Mohammadian in a closely contested two–point final bout. This result determined Mohammadian as the representative for Iran at the 2020 Summer Olympics.

Major results

Freestyle record 

! colspan="7"| International Senior Freestyle Matches
|-
!  Res.
!  Record
!  Opponent
!  Score
!  Date
!  Event
!  Location
|-
! style=background:white colspan=7 |
|-
|Loss
|22–6
|align=left| Mohammad Hossein Mohammadian
|style="font-size:88%"|1–1
|style="font-size:88%" rowspan=3|June 8, 2021
|style="font-size:88%" rowspan=3|2021 Poland Open
|style="text-align:left;font-size:88%;" rowspan=3|
 Warsaw, Poland
|-
|Win
|22–5
|align=left| Alisher Yergali
|style="font-size:88%"|7–2
|-
|Win
|21–5
|align=left| Magomedgadzhi Nurov
|style="font-size:88%"|9–2
|-
! style=background:white colspan=7 |
|-
|Win
|20–5
|align=left| Alisher Yergali
|style="font-size:88%"|TF 12–2
|style="font-size:88%" rowspan=3|April 13–18, 2021
|style="font-size:88%" rowspan=3|2021 Asian Continental Championships
|style="text-align:left;font-size:88%;" rowspan=3|
 Almaty, Kazakhstan
|-
|Win
|19–5
|align=left| Satyawart Kadian
|style="font-size:88%"|TF 10–0
|-
|Win
|18–5
|align=left| Minwon Seo
|style="font-size:88%"|TF 11–0
|-
! style=background:white colspan=7 |
|-
|Win
|17–5
|align=left| Hossein Shahbazi
|style="font-size:88%"|5–0
|style="font-size:88%" rowspan=2|December 17, 2020
|style="font-size:88%" rowspan=2|2020 Iranian Premier Wrestling League
|style="text-align:left;font-size:88%;" rowspan=2|
 Tehran, Iran
|-
|Win
|16–5
|align=left| Alireza Safar
|style="font-size:88%"|
|-
! style=background:white colspan=7 |
|-
|Win
|15–5
|align=left| Mohammad Hossein Mohammadian
|style="font-size:88%"|4–0
|style="font-size:88%" rowspan=4|November 5, 2020
|style="font-size:88%" rowspan=4|2020 Iranian World Team Trials
|style="text-align:left;font-size:88%;" rowspan=4|
 Tehran, Iran
|-
|Win
|14–5
|align=left| Mohammad Hossein Mohammadian
|style="font-size:88%"|8–4
|-
|Win
|13–5
|align=left| Danial Shariati
|style="font-size:88%"|6–2
|-
|Win
|12–5
|align=left| Mojtaba Goleij
|style="font-size:88%"|7–3
|-
! style=background:white colspan=7 |
|-
|Win
|11–5
|align=left| Esmaeil Nejatian
|style="font-size:88%"|FF
|style="font-size:88%" rowspan=2|January 7–8, 2020
|style="font-size:88%" rowspan=2|2020 Takhti Cup
|style="text-align:left;font-size:88%;" rowspan=2|
 Kermanshah, Iran
|-
|Loss
|10–5
|align=left| Mojtaba Goleij
|style="font-size:88%"|4–6
|-
! style=background:white colspan=7 |
|-
|Win
|10–4
|align=left| Rusidanmu Reheman
|style="font-size:88%"|TF 11–0
|style="font-size:88%" |December 19, 2019
|style="font-size:88%" |2019 World Clubs Cup
|style="text-align:left;font-size:88%;" |
 Isfahan, Iran
|-
! style=background:white colspan=7 |
|-
|Loss
|9–4
|align=left| Elizbar Odikadze
|style="font-size:88%"|8–11
|style="font-size:88%" rowspan=2|September 21, 2019
|style="font-size:88%" rowspan=2|2019 World Championships
|style="text-align:left;font-size:88%;" rowspan=2|
 Nur-Sultan, Kazakhstan
|-
|Win
|8–3
|align=left| Ibrahim Ciftci
|style="font-size:88%"|9–1
|-
! style=background:white colspan=7 |
|-
|Loss
|7–3
|align=left| Kyle Snyder
|style="font-size:88%"|1–2
|style="font-size:88%" rowspan=4|July 11, 2019
|style="font-size:88%" rowspan=4|2019 Yasar Dogu International
|style="text-align:left;font-size:88%;" rowspan=4|
 Istanbul, Turkey
|-
|Win
|7–2
|align=left| Aslanbek Alborov
|style="font-size:88%"|TF 10–0
|-
|Win
|6–2
|align=left| Fatih Yaşarlı
|style="font-size:88%"|TF 10–0
|-
|Win
|5–2
|align=left| Abraham Conyedo
|style="font-size:88%"|6–2
|-
! style=background:white colspan=7 |
|-
|Loss
|4–2
|align=left| Reza Yazdani
|style="font-size:88%"|1–2
|style="font-size:88%" rowspan=2|July 1, 2019
|style="font-size:88%" rowspan=2|2019 IRI World Team Trials
|style="text-align:left;font-size:88%;" rowspan=2|
 Mazandaran Province, Iran
|-
|Win
|4–1
|align=left| Hamed Talebi Zarrinkamar
|style="font-size:88%"|3–2
|-
! style=background:white colspan=7 |
|-
|Win
|3–1
|align=left| Chaoqiang Yang
|style="font-size:88%"|TF 11–0
|style="font-size:88%" rowspan=4|November 12–18, 2018
|style="font-size:88%" rowspan=4|2018 U23 World Championships
|style="text-align:left;font-size:88%;" rowspan=4|
 Bucharest, Romania
|-
|Loss
|2–1
|align=left| Givi Matcharashvili
|style="font-size:88%"|TF 0–10
|-
|Win
|2–0
|align=left| Erik Thiele
|style="font-size:88%"|8–0
|-
|Win
|1–0
|align=left| Simone Iannattoni
|style="font-size:88%"|TF 11–0
|-

References 

Living people
Iranian male sport wrestlers
Sportspeople from Mazandaran province
1995 births
Asian Wrestling Championships medalists

External links